Allison may refer to:

People
 Allison (given name) 
 Allison (surname) (includes a list of people with this name)
 Eugene Allison Smith (1922-1980), American politician and farmer

Companies
 Allison Engine Company, American aircraft engine manufacturer
 Allison Transmission, American manufacturer of automatic transmissions and hybrid propulsion systems
 Allison & Allison, American architectural firm
 Allison & Busby, English publishing house
 Cummins Allison, American manufacturer of currency handling and coin handling systems

Literature
 Allison (novel series), a novel and anime series by Keiichi Sigsawa
 Allison, a picture book by Allen Say

Music
 Allison (band), a Mexican pop punk band
 Allison (album), their 2006 album
 The Allisons, an English pop duo
 "Allison", a song by American Hi-Fi from Blood & Lemonade
 "Allison", a 2007 song by Permanent Me from After the Room Clears
 "Allison", a 1990 song by Pixies from Bossanova

Places

Antarctica
 Allison Bay
 Allison Islands
 Allison Glacier
 Allison Glacier (Heard Island), an ice stream on the west side of Heard Island in the southern Indian Ocean
 Allison Peninsula, Ellsworth Land

Canada
 Allison Harbour, a natural harbour in British Columbia
 Allison Pass, a highway summit in British Columbia
 Allison, New Brunswick

United States
 Mount Allison, a mountain near Fremont, California
 Allison, Colorado
 Allison Township, Lawrence County, Illinois
 Allison, Iowa
 Allison Township, Decatur County, Kansas
 Allison, Kansas
 Lake Allison, a temporary lake in the Willamette Valley of Oregon
 Allison, Missouri
 Allison Township, Clinton County, Pennsylvania
 Allison Creek, a stream in South Dakota
 Allison Township, Brown County, South Dakota
 Allison, Texas

Storms
 Tropical Storm Allison (1989)
 Hurricane Allison (1995), a hurricane that made landfall on the Florida Panhandle
 Tropical Storm Allison (2001)

Other uses
 Allison (1795 ship), a ship launched in 1776 that the British captured in 1795
 Mount Allison University, a Canadian university in Sackville, New Brunswick

See also
 Allison Hill (Harrisburg), a neighborhood in Harrisburg, Pennsylvania
 Allison House (disambiguation)
 Allison Park, Pennsylvania, a census-designated place in Allegheny County, Pennsylvania
 Alison (disambiguation)
 Alisoun (disambiguation)
 Allicin, a chemical compound
 Alisson (disambiguation)
 Allisson (disambiguation)
 Alyson, given name
 Allyson, given name
 Alysson, given name
 List of tropical storms named Allison